Cédric Béal (born 17 October 1986) is a retired French rugby union and sevens player who played as a Flanker for RC Toulonnais, Grenoble, Dax, Provence and Mont-de-Marsan. (1.90 m, 106 kg). Now working as the CDF coach at Lyon.

Honours

Club 
 Pro D2 Champions : 2008
 Semi-finalist in the championnat de France Espoirs : 2006
 Finaliste of the championnat de France Reichel : 2005
 Champion of France in rugby sevens under 21
 Semi-Finalist in the FIRA Rugby Sevens European Championships

National team 
 France rugby sevens (took part in the Georgia and Tunisia tournaments 2006 and Tunisia, Hong Kong and Adelaide 2007)

References

External links 
  Player profile at lequipe.fr
  Statistics at itsrugby.fr
  Les Bleus Sevens, site of the France rugby sevens team

1986 births
Living people
French rugby union players
France international rugby sevens players
People from Orange, Vaucluse
RC Toulonnais players
Rugby union flankers
Male rugby sevens players
Sportspeople from Vaucluse